These are the results of the open water swimming competition at the 2003 World Aquatics Championships, which took place in Barcelona, Spain.

Medal table

Medal summary

Men

Women

References

Open Water results section of the 2003 World Championships results from OmegaTiming.com; retrieved 2019-07-18.

Open water swimming
2003 in swimming
Open water swimming at the World Aquatics Championships